Odd Narud (3 February 1919 – 22 April 2000) was a Norwegian businessperson.

He was born in Furnes, and was educated as a siv.øk. He was hired in Norsk Hydro in 1943, advanced to become CFO in 1960 and assisting director-general in 1976. In 1977 he was hired as director-general (CEO), staying in this position until 1984.

References

1919 births
2000 deaths
People from Ringsaker
20th-century Norwegian businesspeople
Norsk Hydro people
20th-century  Norwegian economists
People from Furnes, Norway